Peter Wadabwa (born 14 September 1988) is a Malawian footballer who currently plays for Be Forward Wanderers

International career
Wadabwa is part of the Malawi national football team and represented his country at 2010 African Cup of Nations.

International goals
Scores and results list Malawi's goal tally first.

References

External links

1988 births
Living people
Malawian footballers
Malawi international footballers
2010 Africa Cup of Nations players
Expatriate soccer players in South Africa
Malawian expatriate sportspeople in South Africa
Malawian expatriate footballers
Jomo Cosmos F.C. players
Silver Strikers FC players
ESCOM United FC players
Association football midfielders
Association football forwards